Trapelus sanguinolentus, the steppe agama, is a species of agama found in Russia, Kazakhstan, Kyrgyzstan, Tajikistan, Iran, Afghanistan, and China.

References

Trapelus
Lizards of Asia
Taxa named by Peter Simon Pallas
Reptiles described in 1814